Miss International 1962, the 3rd Miss International pageant, was held on August 18, 1962 at the Long Beach Municipal Auditorium in Long Beach, California, United States. 50 contestants competed for the pageant. Finally, Tania Verstak from Australia was crowned as Miss International 1962 by outgoing titleholder, Stam van Baer from Holland.

Results

Placements

Special Awards

Preliminary Competition Winners

Contestants

  - Maria Bueno
  - Tania Verstak
  - Inge Jaklin
  - Danièle Defrère
  - Olga Pantoja Antelo
  - Julieta Strauss
  - Ave Henriques
  - Susan Peters
  - Jennifer Labrooy
  - Sonia Heidman Gómez
  - Milagros García Duval
  - Margarita Arosemena Gómez
  - Sue Burgess
  - Eeva Malinen
  - Erni Jung
  - Ioanna Delakou
  - Catharina Johanna Lodders
  - Maria Gudmundsdóttir
  - Sheila Chonkar
  - Mona Burrows
  - Nurit Newman
  - Maria Vianello
  - Kaoru Maki
  - Vivian Nazzal
  - Sohn Yang-ja
  - Mona Slim
  - Agnes Anderson
  - Brita Gerson
  - Brenda Maureen Alvisse
  - Therese Gonzalez
  - Maureen Waaka †
  - María Hasbani
  - Beate Brevik Johansen
  - Ana Cecilia Maruri
  - Gloria Alderete Irala
  - Cynthia Lucero Ugalde
  - Agnes Toro
  - Elizabeth Burns
  - Nancy Liew
  - Aletta Strydom
  - Karin Hyldgaard Jensen
  - Rosemarie Loeliger
  - Yolanda Flohr
  - Anne Yui Fang
  - Güler Samuray
  - Silvia Romero
  - Carolyn Joyner
  - Olga Antonetti Nuñez †
  - Diane Thomas
  - Anne Marie Sutherland (Port of Spain, Trinidad)

Notes

Withdrawals
  - Jane Lim (due to illness)
  - Michèle Wargnier (fainted during the preliminaries)
  - Mireille Hollant
  - Acidalia Medina

External links
Pageantopolis - Miss International 1962

References

1962
20th century in Los Angeles County, California
1962 beauty pageants
Beauty pageants in the United States